Tsimba is a surname. Notable people with the surname include:
Cédric Tsimba (born 1984), Swiss footballer
Freddy Tsimba (born 1967), Democratic Republic of the Congo sculptor
Kennedy Tsimba (born 1974), South African rugby player and coach
Richard Tsimba (1965–2000), Zimbabwean rugby player